Nuclearia is a nucleariid genus.

Species include:
 Species ?Astrodisculus affinis Schouteden 1905
 Species ?Astrodisculus araneiformis Schewiakoff 1893
 Species ?Astrodisculus laciniatus Penard 1904 [Chlamydaster lacinatus (Penard 1904) Rainer 1968]
 Species ?Astrodisculus marinus Kufferath 1952
 Species ?Astrodisculus minutus Greeff 1869
 Species ?Heliophrys variabilis
 Species ?Nuclearina similis
 Species ?N. amphizonellae Penard 1917
 Species ?N. conspicua West 1903
 Species ?N. delicatula Cienkowsky 1865
 Species ?N. lohmanni Kufferath 1952
 Species ?N. pseudotenelloides
 Species N. flavescens (Greef 1869) Patterson 1984 [Astrodisculus flavescens Greeff 1869]
 Species N. flavocapsulata (Greef 1869) Patterson 1984 [Astrodisculus flavocapsulata Greeff 1869; Astrodisculus penari Roskin 1929; Astrodisculus serratus Walton 1930; Heliosphaerium polyedricum Frenzel 1897]
 Species N. leuckarti (Frenzel 1897) Patterson 1984 [Nuclearina leuckarti Frenzel 1897]
 Species N. moebiusi Frenzel 1897
 Species N. pattersoni Dyková et al. 2003
 Species N. polypodia Schewiakoff 1863
 Species N. radians (Greef 1869) Patterson 1984 [Astrodisculus radians Greeff 1869 sensu Penard 1904 non Stern 1924; Nucleosphaerium radians (Greef 1869); Nucleosphaerium tuckeri Cann & Page 1979; Heliosphaerium aster Frenzel 1897; Heliophrys varians West]
 Species N. simplex Cienkowsky 1865 [Nuclearella variabilis Frenzel 1897]
 Species N. thermophila Yoshida, Nakayama & Inouye 2009
 Species N. rubra (Greef 1869) Patterson 1984 [Astrodisculus rubra Greeff 1869; Astrodisculus zonatus Penard 1904; Nuclearia caulescens Penard 1903: pro parte; Nuclearia zonatus (Penard 1904) Siemensma 1981]

References

Nucleariids
Eukaryote genera